Andrew Douglas Purser (born 31 October 1958) is a former Australian rules footballer who played for the Footscray Football Club in the Victorian Football League (VFL) and for the East Fremantle Football Club and West Perth Football Club in the Western Australian Football League (WAFL).

A ruckman, Purser was a premiership player with East Fremantle in 1979. Purser was one of several West Australian footballers brought over to Footscray in the 1980s by general manager and former Carlton administrator Shane O'Sullivan; others included Simon Beasley, Murray Rance, Sharks teammate Jim Sewell and Brad Hardie. Purser was among 15 new players to debut for Footscray in 1983 and although undersized he quickly gained a reputation as one of the finest ruckmen in the VFL. In just his second season, he won the Charles Sutton Medal for Footscray's best and fairest player.

However, by the end of 1987, the physical burden of shouldering the main ruck responsibilities had taken its toll on Purser, saying years later that he felt he was "running out of steam". His main career as a stockbroker was also seriously affected by the Black Monday crash in October, which eventually prompted him and his wife Jenny to return to Western Australia, despite the best efforts of Footscray to keep him at the club.

In a remarkable testament to his durability, Purser had missed only one out of a possible 113 senior VFL games during his time at Footscray.

He has been running his own finance business in Subiaco, Western Australia.

Personal
Purser's son, Ben, is a former Perth Wildcats development player.

References

External links

1958 births
Living people
Australian rules footballers from Western Australia
Charles Sutton Medal winners
East Fremantle Football Club players
West Perth Football Club players
Western Bulldogs players
Western Australian State of Origin players